Sesquilé is a town and municipality in Almeidas Province in the department of Cundinamarca, Colombia. Sesquilé in the Chibcha language of the Muisca means "hot water".

Sesquilé is adjacent to Tominé Reservoir and nearby Lake Guatavita, the suspected site of the El Dorado legend.

Tourism 
Laguna del cacique Guatavita, a beautiful, ecologically pristine mountaintop lake well inside paramo altitude, it is one of the places contesting being the location for the legend of El Dorado. It is believed (by some) that its bottom is covered in large quantities of gold, due to the story of a ceremony performed on and in its waters. It is said that each cacique, at the beginning of his reign, was covered in gold dust and ritually rafted to the middle of the lake, where he swam to bathe the heavy gold off, then made offerings of riches in gold works. Though tentative evidence exists for such ceremony, in the form of the pre-Columbian gold sculpture (1 ft x 6in x 1 ft) of the raft with a cacique and priests astride it, currently kept at the Gold Museum, Bogota, it is very likely the only evidence, so that the ceremony itself remains the stuff of legend. At least one search with SCUBA gear has been attempted, with unsuccessful results due to the murkiness, great depth and dangerously low temperature of the water. Swimming in the lake is not advisable, for ecological as well as the obvious medical reasons. Hiking trails are available and camping is possible (open fires are forbidden), but it is best to check with the local police to make sure it is safe at the time (due to the ever-present guerrilla situation in the country) and so that the authorities are advised as to where hikers are going in case they have trouble returning, for whatever reason.
 Arts and crafts: woolen clothing
 Caminos Reales: ancient trails of the Muiscas, now rehabilitated for hiking
 Cañón de Las Águilas (river gorge)
 Capilla de Los Dolores: beautiful chapel of colonial architecture which has been well preserved and keeps its original masonry and ornamentation intact
 Cerro de Covadonga (mountain)
 Cerro de Las Tres Viejas (mountain): the three summits where known by the pre-Columbian natives as Chía, Vitaca and Quemuenchatocha, it is one of the places in the region most imbued in history and legend
 Cerro Pan de Azúcar (mountain)
 Club Náutico La Marina de Guatavita (nautical club at Tominé Lake)
 Tominé Dam & Lake, it stocks around 600 million cubic meters of water for consumption mainly in Bogotá. The lake is apt for windsurfing and sailing.

Trivia 
 Under construction in Sesquilé is a factory of Heineken, projected to be finished in 2017

Gallery

References

External links 

  Cundinamarca department official website

Municipalities of Cundinamarca Department
Populated places established in 1600
1600 establishments in the Spanish Empire
Muisca Confederation
Muysccubun